Takam Kingdom was a region administrated by the Thapas which turned into a Chaubise Parbat State ruled by King Dimba Bam of Samalvanshi Malla clan.

It was later merged to Kingdom of Nepal on 14 Ashoj 1843 BS by the Gorkhali army under the leadership of Amar Singh Thapa, Yog Narayan Malla, Damodar Pande and Jiba Shah. The present day Takam VDC lies in the region.

Gallery

See also 

 Gorkha Kingdom
 Khasa Kingdom

References 

Former countries in South Asia
Former kingdoms
History of Nepal
Empires and kingdoms of Nepal